The Canon FD lens mount is a physical standard for connecting a photographic lens to a 35mm single-lens reflex camera body.  The standard was developed by Canon of Japan and was introduced in March 1971 with the Canon F-1 camera. It served as the Canon SLR interchangeable lens mounting system until the 1987 introduction of the Canon EOS series cameras, which use the newer EF lens mount.  The FD mount lingered through the release of the 1990 Canon T60, the last camera introduced in the FD system, and the end of the Canon New F-1 product cycle in 1992.

The FD mount was based upon and replaced Canon's earlier FL mount (which in turn had replaced the R mount); FD-mount cameras can use FL lenses in stop-down metering mode.  Though never officially explained by Canon, others have attempted to assign a meaning to the "FD" designation.  One such attempt states that the "FD" notation stands for "Focal-plane shutter with Dual linkage for diaphragm control"; in actuality, there were two linkages and two signals: the automatic aperture lever, aperture signal lever, full aperture signal pin, and automatic exposure lock pin.  This is twice the previous lens series, which used the "FL" designation, said to mean "Focal-plane shutter, Linked mount."

Over the 21-plus years of production, Canon introduced 134 different FD lenses ranging from 7.5mm through 1,200mm in seventeen different fixed focal lengths and nineteen different zoom ranges, one of the most, if not the most, extensive manual focus lens lines ever produced.

The Canon FD system enjoyed huge popularity in the 1970s and 1980s, when it established and grew a market share with professional photographers as well as having equipped over a million consumer users. Indeed, sales of the Canon AE-1 camera alone exceeded one million.

Canon obsoleted the FD mount by its decision to create the all-electronic EF mount. Thus, the FD mount system, with limited provision for auto-focus, is now commercially obsolete, and Canon FD cameras and lenses are available for low prices on the second-hand market.  This makes the system very attractive to 35mm film photographers who demand the highest optical quality, while not needing auto focus capability.

FD lenses can be used on many mirrorless interchangeable-lens cameras with a suitable adapter. They are a popular alternative to modern lenses among some users, though they lack autofocus.

Background

The FD lens mount is a breech-lock mount, which is a variation of the common triple-flanged bayonet attachment. The advantage of the breech-lock over the bayonet is that neither the contact surfaces between the body and lens, nor the signalling mechanisms, rotate against each other when the lens is mounted. This prevents any mechanical wear, which could conceivably reduce the very precise lens-to-film distance or introduce communication errors between lens and body.

Canon's first iteration of the FD breech-lock, extended forward from the earlier R- and FL-series lenses, used a rotating mounting ring at the rear of the lens; the lens body itself did not rotate for mounting. Its minor disadvantage was a somewhat slower lens change than a bayonet.

There are three different versions of breech ring FD lenses:

 The first version had a chrome plated front barrel (nicknamed "chrome nose") and a green "o" for auto exposure.   
 The second version had a black front barrel and still had a green "o" for auto exposure.  
 The third version had a black front barrel, and a green "A" for auto exposure. These different versions are detailed below under variants.

Second-generation FD lenses, first marketed in 1979 as New FD, are mounted like bayonet-mount lenses in that the photographer twists the entire lens body to mount and dismount, though the actual mating surfaces still remain fixed.  This retained the advantages of the breech-lock mount while enabling the convenience of a bayonet. The letters SC or SSC, to indicate the lens coating, were no longer put on the lenses. Canon documents stated that All new FD lenses except for the new FD 50mm F1.8 had SSC coatings. Canon later chose a bayonet-style mount for its EOS system's EF lenses, where there is no precision mechanical coupling.

Like its FL predecessor, the FD mount system allowed automatic diaphragm function, but in addition, a new signal pin supported full-aperture metering. A second signal pin for the "auto" setting of the aperture dial, plus a linkage to allow the camera to set the degree of diaphragm opening, enabled integral auto-exposure. The first camera to use this was the 1971 Canon F-1, when equipped with the Servo EE Finder. Later, the Canon EF of 1973 had automatic exposure built-in, as did the very popular Canon A-series cameras (save the AT-1) beginning in 1976.

Thus, starting with the first FD lenses produced in late 1970, all FD lenses had the capability of supporting full-aperture metering and multiple Automatic Exposure (AE) modes using both shutter-preferred and aperture-preferred modes. Even Programmed AE was possible with no modifications to the lens mount, though at the time of its introduction Canon did not have an AE camera body in the FD line. This was a design triumph for Canon that no other camera or lens maker was able to equal in 1970. Every other camera manufacturer had to make one or more alterations to its lens mount to enable full aperture metering, and later AE and or Programmed AE operation.

The FD mount has no support for either electrical or mechanical lens-body communication required for autofocus, which was a primary reason for its retirement. (The three AC series lenses, extended from the FD lens mount, described below, are an exception). While Canon could have adapted its mount to support auto-focus, as did other manufacturers, the company instead chose to make a clean break with the past and design a completely new interface with support for electrical signaling and control.

Lens coatings, design variants
The earliest breech-lock Canon FD lenses (1970-1973) are generally recognizable by a chrome (silver) filter ring at the front (this ring includes its own bayonet used to mount an appropriate lens hood). Nicknamed 'chrome nose' lenses, these used two new proprietary lens coatings, designated "S.C." (Spectra Coating) and "S.S.C." (Super Spectra Coating), but neither coating was signified on the front of the lens. These were both multi-coatings, but indicated two quality grades.  In the 'chrome nose' series, only the large-aperture 55mm f/1.2, and 55mm F1.2 AL (Aspherical) and the 7.5mm Fish-Eye lenses used S.S.C. coating. This first series of FD lenses shared other characteristics that would later change; the breech-lock ring can be rotated freely without mounting it on a camera body, and the aperture ring had a green "o" at the end of the scale to indicate automatic aperture operation, which at the time was only possible with an F-1 body that had the Servo EE Finder attached. The aperture ring could be rotated freely on and off of "o", although the small AE switch pin in the back of the lens (which came out when the aperture ring was rotated to "o") prevented one from doing this unless the body has the appropriate small hole in the proper location. There are chrome nose first generation FD lenses without chrome front barrels: several wide angle lenses and some telephoto lenses have black barrels, but their date code, lack of an aperture lock button and freely rotating breech ring place them into the first version FD lens group.

The second series of breech-lock FD lenses (1973-1976), which discontinued the chrome barrel front, is engraved "S.C." in white or "S.S.C." in red on the front of the lens. The S.S.C. coating was extended to most lenses in this series. The basic S.C. coating was, for the most part, limited to the least expensive lenses. These 2nd breech ring generation FD lenses still had a green "o", but now there was a chrome lock button on the aperture ring that had to be depressed to put the lens on or take the lens off of "o". One still could not put the lens on "o" unless the camera body had the AE switch pin hole. And the lens could not be mounted on a non-EE / AE body if the lens was set on "o". The breech ring now featured a lock which prevented it from rotating unless a rear cap was put on or the lens was mounted to a body. Further, the breech ring rotated slightly when the lens was mounted to aid in getting the lens securely mounted. The aperture diaphragm was opened fully when the breech ring was in the locked position.

The third variant, made from 1976 to the end of production of breech ring FD lenses (around 1980) changed the green "o" to a green "A" and the chrome aperture ring lock button was changed from chrome to black. The breech ring was still locked unless mounted and it still had the spring loaded twist to make it easier to mount the lens. The third version FD 50mm F1.8 lens also received a plastic front barrel to reduce size and weight. This corresponded with the introduction of the Canon A-series cameras which were smaller and lighter than the older, larger and heavier "F-series" bodies.

In 1978, with the introduction of the New FD series (nicknamed 'FDn'), the coating type was no longer specified on the lens front. All of these lenses received S.S.C. coating, with the sole exception of the 50mm  lens.  

The original breech-lock FD lenses and the New FD lenses are completely functionally interchangeable, and may each be used on any FD camera body. A minor operational difference between New FD and earlier lenses occurs only when using a Canon New F-1 body with the AE Finder FN in aperture preferred AE mode. The New FD lenses' aperture rings were placed closer to the rear of the lens so that the aperture value is visible in the new F-1's viewfinder, via an optical prism. Earlier lenses' aperture scales do not align properly with the prism, and are therefore not visible.

Aspherical, Fluorite or 'L' lenses
An enhanced range of FD lenses was available to photographers who required the highest optical and mechanical performance.  In addition to more robust mechanical construction, these lenses used a variety of special technologies, including ground aspherical surfaces, calcium fluorite optical elements, and ultra-low-dispersion glass. Canon used these means to achieve outstanding optical performance at the extremes of lens design: wide apertures and extreme focal lengths. Aspherical surfaces improved performance of wide-angle and standard lenses at very wide apertures.  Ultra-low dispersion and fluorite elements virtually eliminated chromatic aberration at long focal lengths.

The earlier versions of these lenses carried "AL", "Aspherical", or "Fluorite" indications on the front of the lens.  The post-1979 'New FD' versions acknowledged all the exotic technologies under the single designation "L" (commonly believed to indicate 'luxury' or 'asphericaL').  Canon has continued the "L" designation, and the famous red ring around the lens front, in the current EF autofocus lenses for EOS cameras, where the symbol now officially stands for "Luxury."

Macro lenses
The FD series included a number of zoom lenses with close-focusing mechanisms, targeted at amateur photographers. The series also included three true macro lenses at 50mm, 100mm, and 200mm. These offered exceptionally close focusing and were corrected for flatness of field at close shooting distances. The 50mm and 100mm were marketed with extension tubes that allowed life-size reproduction. The 200mm can reach life size without additional extension.

Special-purpose lenses
Canon offered seven specialty lenses for the FD mount.  The 35mm 2.8 Tilt-Shift lens is a perspective control lens.  It may be tilted ±8 degrees for depth of field control, or shifted 11mm for perspective control. Though it uses the breech-lock mount, it is not literally an FD lens since its diaphragm is operated manually and it must be used with stop-down metering.

The 85mm 2.8 Soft Focus lens is designed for portraiture. The photographer may introduce three levels of spherical aberration via a push-pull ring. Since aperture also affects the magnitude of the soft-focus effect, a wide range of results are possible. The lens may also be used as a standard short telephoto. It offers all FD features.

The Reflex 500mm 8 lens is a supertelephoto mirror lens of high optical quality which shares the unique characteristics of all mirror lenses with a central obstruction. Since its aperture is fixed at 8, it lacks FD signals and controls. It must be used in manual or stopped-down metering mode.

Two other specialty lenses are the fisheyes. Two versions were produced.  The 7.5mm 5.6 is a circular fisheye, rendering a 180 degree field of view in a 23mm image circle. It requires manual operation and stopped-down metering. The 15mm 2.8 is a full-frame fisheye, rendering a 180 degree field of view across the diagonal of the 35mm frame with the considerable barrel distortion of a fisheye lens. It includes all FD features and may be used with automatic exposure. Both lenses include internal filters.

The remaining specialty lenses are the 20mm 3.5 and 35mm 2.8 Macrophoto lenses. Similar to microscope objectives, they provide magnifications of 4X-10X and 2X-6X respectively when mounted on the FD Auto Bellows. They can only be used with a bellows, via an FD adapter; while the adapter can mechanically mount them directly to a camera, they cannot function optically. They are not properly FD lenses, but are listed here because they are part of the whole system.

FD autofocusing lenses
Before the FD mount was obsoleted by the EOS system, Canon built four autofocus lenses. Of these, only the FD 35-70mm f/4 AF was capable of autofocus on all FD cameras. The others, known as AC lenses, offered autofocus only on the T80 camera.

The FD 35-70mm f/4 AF contained an entirely independent autofocus system and was among the world's first autofocus zoom lenses (the Pentax ME F was the first ). The autofocus system was activated by a button on the side of the lens, and involved no communication with the camera body. It was reasonably accurate with still subjects, but was too slow to be a practical solution for moving subjects such as sports.

Further development produced the AC derivative of the FD mount. Three AC lenses were manufactured, the AC 50mm 1.8, AC 35-70mm 3.5-4.5, and AC 75-200mm 4.5. All were released in April, 1985 alongside the Canon T80 camera, which was the only camera ever manufactured to take advantage of the AC lenses' AF capabilities. The lenses communicated with the T80 via a modified FD mount with added electrical contacts. They lacked an aperture ring, and were therefore usable only in automatic-exposure modes.  They were otherwise identical to the FD mount and could be manually focused on those FD-mount cameras that could control the aperture.  The AC line proved to be a dead-end development in light of the EF series development, and Canon would abandon the capability in the three remaining FD-mount cameras it produced, the New F-1, T90, and T60.

Using FD lenses on other mounts
The 42mm flange focal distance of the FD mount is shorter than that of most other lens mounts. Therefore, some lenses from other period cameras with longer flange focal distance can be mounted on Canon FD-mount cameras with appropriate adapters and still retain infinity focus.  FD lenses can be adapted to other cameras with longer flange focal distances, though the lenses cannot focus to infinity unless the adapter contains an optical correction element which may compromise image quality, as it is not part of the original FD lens optical design.

Following the introduction of the EOS camera line, whose EF lens mount has a 44 mm flange focal distance, Canon briefly marketed an adapter which enabled certain FD telephoto lenses to be used on EOS bodies. The adapter contained high-quality corrective optics and functioned as a 1.26x tele-converter; it could not be used on lenses shorter than 200mm in focal length, nor any lens that interfered with its protruding optics. The adapter was produced in limited numbers, with the intent of easing the initial cost of conversion for professional users who owned expensive FD telephoto lenses. Originally priced at $250, these adapters are now scarce and highly valued, selling for around $1,000 on the second-hand market. Other inexpensive aftermarket FD to EOS adapters are available and can be used at the cost of severely reduced image quality, particularly at large apertures.

Mechanically skilled photographers and technicians have successfully retrofitted FD lenses with alternative mounts, including the Arri PL mount and Canon EF mount.

FD lenses can be mounted on Canon rangefinder cameras or other Leica screw mount cameras using the Canon Lens Mount Adapter B, but rangefinder-coupled focusing is lost.

FD lenses have been regularly used with the Micro Four Thirds system since its introduction in 2008. It has a flange focal distance of only 20mm and a 2× crop factor, halving the field of view compared to the original 24x36mm film frame.

As of 2012, with the introduction of the Canon EOS M mirrorless camera,  almost all FD or FL lenses can be successfully adapted with infinity focus available without the need for a compensating lens, thus not compromising resolution, contrast and distortion performance. The EOS-M has an 18 megapixel APS-C sensor, offering image quality and resolution equivalent to other Canon EF-S APS-C sized sensors, retaining their 1.6× crop factor. The FD/FL lens must be manually focused and metering is done with aperture priority.

FD lenses can also be mounted to current mirrorless digital cameras with short flange focal distance, using simple mechanical adapters without optical correction. FD lenses, especially wide and ultra-wide f/2.8, f/2 and f/1.4 variants, have proven popular options for videography for these mirrorless formats.

Another popular option is the Sony NEX/Sony ILCE system of mirrorless interchangeable lens cameras with Sony E-mount. The E-mount has a flange distance of 18mm and a 1.5× crop factor with APS-C sensor cameras and a 1× crop factor with full frame sensor cameras, f. i. the Sony α7 series introduced in late 2013.

List of Canon-made FD-mount camera bodies and lenses

FD cameras
 Canon F-1 (1971)
 Canon FTb (1971)
 Canon FTbn (1973)
 Canon EF (1973)
 Canon TLb (1974)
 Canon TX (1975)
 Canon F-1n (slight revision of 1971 F-1) (1976)
 Canon AE-1 (1976)
 Canon AT-1 (1976)
 Canon A-1 (1978)
 Canon AV-1 (1979)
 Canon New F-1 (total redesign of the F-1) (1981)
 Canon AE-1 Program (1981)
 Canon AL-1 (1982)
 Canon T50 (1983)
 Canon T70 (1984)
 Canon T80 (1985)
 Canon T90 (1986)
 Canon T60 (1990)

FD lenses
The FD series includes lenses of all standard focal lengths ranging from 7.5mm to 800mm. At least two different maximum apertures were offered at each focal length from 24mm to 500mm.

The original generation of FD lenses featured a silver colored locking ring at the base.  Only the locking ring turns to lock the lens to the camera body; the lens body remains stationary. The later New FD lenses have a black mount which includes a lens release button.

Note that some lenses listed below were marketed in only one generation.  Lenses of identical focal lengths and maximum apertures that spanned both generations, in addition to their altered mounts, were typically smaller and lighter in the New FD generation, and usually used smaller diameter filters.

Fisheye
 7.5mm 5.6
 7.5mm 5.6 S.S.C.
 New Fisheye 7.5mm f/5.6
 15mm 2.8 S.S.C.
 
 New Fisheye 15mm f/2.8

Ultra wide-angle
 New FD 14mm 2.8L
 17mm 4
 17mm 4 S.S.C.
 New FD 17mm 4
 20mm 2.8 S.S.C.
 New FD 20mm 2.8

Wide-angle
 24mm 1.4 S.S.C. Aspherical
 New FD 24mm 1.4L
 New FD 24mm 2.0
 24mm 2.8
 24mm 2.8 S.S.C.
 New FD 24mm 2.8
 New FD 28mm 2.0
 28mm 2 S.S.C.
 28mm 2.8 S.C.
 New FD 28mm 2.8
 28mm 3.5
 28mm 3.5 S.C.
 35mm 2
 35mm 2 I
 35mm 2 II
 35mm 2 III
 35mm 2 S.S.C. I
 35mm 2 S.S.C. II
 New FD 35mm 2.0
 New FD 35mm 2.8
 TS 35mm 2.8 S.S.C. (tilt-shift perspective correction)
 35mm 3.5
 35mm 3.5 S.C. I
 35mm 3.5 S.C. II
 35mm 3.5 S.C. III

Normal

 New FD 50mm 1.2
 New FD 50mm 1.2L
 50mm 1.4
 50mm 1.4 S.S.C. (I)
 50mm 1.4 S.S.C. (II)
 New FD 50mm 1.4
 50mm 1.8 (I)
 50mm 1.8 (II)
 50mm 1.8 S.C. (I)
 50mm 1.8 S.C. (II)
 New FD 50mm 1.8
 New FD 50mm 2.0
 Macro 50mm 3.5 S.S.C.
 New FD 50mm 3.5 Macro
 55mm 1.2
 55mm 1.2 AL
 55mm 1.2 S.S.C.
 55mm 1.2 S.S.C. AL
 55mm 1.2 S.S.C. Aspherical

Telephoto
 85mm 1.2 S.S.C. Aspherical
 New FD 85mm 1.2L
 85mm 1.8 S.S.C.
 New FD 85mm 1.8
 New FD 85mm 2.8 Soft Focus
 New FD 100mm 2.0
 100mm 2.8
 100mm 2.8 S.S.C.
 New FD 100mm 2.8
 Macro 100mm 4 S.C.
 New FD 100mm 4 Macro
 New FD 135mm 2
 135mm 2.5
 135mm 2.5 S.C.
 New FD 135mm 2.8
 135mm 3.5
 135mm 3.5 S.C. (I)
 135mm 3.5 S.C. (II)
 New FD 135mm 3.5
 New FD 200mm 1.8L
 200mm 2.8 S.S.C.
 New FD 200mm 2.8
 New FD 200mm 2.8 Rear Focusing/Internal Focus
 200mm 4
 200mm 4 S.S.C.
 New FD 200mm 4
 New FD 200mm 4 Macro
 300mm 2.8 S.S.C. Fluorite
 New FD 300mm 2.8L
 300mm 4 S.S.C.
 New FD 300mm 4
 New FD 300mm 4L
 300mm 5.6
 300mm 5.6 S.C.
 300mm 5.6 S.S.C.
 New FD 300mm 5.6

Supertelephoto
 400mm 4.5 S.S.C.
 New FD 400mm 4.5
 Canon FD 400mm f/2.8L
 500mm 4.5L
 New FD 500mm 4.5L
 Reflex 500mm 8 S.S.C.
 

 600mm 4.5 S.S.C.
 New FD 600mm 4.5
 800mm 5.6 S.S.C.
 New FD 800mm 5.6L
Special limited production:
 800mm 3.8 Mirror
 2000mm 11 Mirror
 5200mm 14 Mirror
 In addition, a 1200mm 5.6L lens was developed and used at the 1984 Summer Olympics, but never marketed as an FD lens. All copies of that lens were shipped back to Canon headquarters in Japan, converted to the EF mount, and sold as EF lenses.

Zoom

 New FD 20-35mm 3.5L
 24-35mm 3.5 S.S.C. Aspherical
 New FD 24-35mm 3.5L
 28-50mm 3.5 S.S.C.
 New FD 28-50mm 2.8-3.5
 New FD 28-55mm 3.5-4.5
 New FD 28-85mm 4
 35-70mm 2.8-3.5 S.S.C.
 New FD 35-70mm 2.8-3.5
 New FD 35-70mm 3.5-4.5
 New FD 35-70mm 4
 New FD 35-70mm 4 Autofocus
 New FD 35-105mm 3.5
 New FD 35-105mm 3.5-4.5
 New FD 50-135mm 4.5
 New FD 50-300mm 4.5L
 New FD 70-150mm 4.5
 New FD 70-210mm 4
 New FD 75-200mm 4.5
 Soligor 80-200mm f/3.5
 80-200mm 4 S.S.C.
 New FD 80-200mm 4
 New FD 80-200mm 4L
 85-300mm 4.5 S.S.C
 New FD 85-300mm 4.5
 100-200mm 5.6
 100-200mm 5.6 S.S.C.
 New FD 100-200mm 5.6
 New FD 100-300mm 5.6
 New FD 100-300mm 5.6 (second version)
 New FD 100-300mm 5.6L
 New FD 150-600mm 5.6L

Macrophoto lenses
 Macrophoto Lens 20mm f/2.8
 Macrophoto Lens 35mm f/2.8

References

External links
 Canon FD Lens Specifications
 Extensive FD Reference Page at Photography in Malaysia.
 Canon FD FAQL.
 Canon FD Camera and Lens reviews

 FD lens mount
Canon FD lenses
Lens mounts